Pennsylvania Station was a railroad station in Cincinnati, Ohio, that served the Pennsylvania Railroad (PRR), for which it was named, and the Louisville and Nashville Railroad.  Built in 1880, it stood at the corner of Pearl and Butler Streets just east of the L & N bridge.  Pennsylvania Station was one of two stations in Downtown Cincinnati served by the PRR.  The other was the  Cincinnati, Lebanon and Northern Railway station on Court Street, after that line's acquisition by the PRR.

On April 2, 1933, all passenger service to Cincinnati was rerouted to Cincinnati Union Terminal, and Pennsylvania Station was abandoned.

References

Railway stations in the United States opened in 1880
Passenger rail transportation in Cincinnati
Former railway stations in Ohio
Former Pennsylvania Railroad stations
Cincinnati
Demolished railway stations in the United States
Railway stations closed in 1933
Transportation buildings and structures in Cincinnati